Matrix metalloproteinases (MMPs), also known as matrix metallopeptidases or matrixins, are metalloproteinases that are calcium-dependent zinc-containing endopeptidases; other family members are adamalysins, serralysins, and astacins. The MMPs belong to a larger family of proteases known as the metzincin superfamily.

Collectively, these enzymes are capable of degrading all kinds of extracellular matrix proteins, but also can process a number of bioactive molecules. They are known to be involved in the cleavage of cell surface receptors, the release of apoptotic ligands (such as the FAS ligand), and chemokine/cytokine inactivation. MMPs are also thought to play a major role in cell behaviors such as cell proliferation, migration (adhesion/dispersion), differentiation, angiogenesis, apoptosis, and host defense.

They were first described in vertebrates (1962), including humans, but have since been found in invertebrates and plants. They are distinguished from other endopeptidases by their dependence on metal ions as cofactors, their ability to degrade extracellular matrix, and their specific evolutionary DNA sequence.

History
MMPs were described initially by Jerome Gross and Charles Lapiere (1962), who observed enzymatic activity (collagen triple helix degradation) during tadpole tail metamorphosis (by placing a tadpole tail in a collagen matrix plate). Therefore, the enzyme was named interstitial collagenase (MMP-1).

Later, it was purified from human skin (1968), and was recognized to be synthesized as a zymogen.

The "cysteine switch" was described in 1990.

Structure
The MMPs have a common domain structure. The three common domains are the pro-peptide, the catalytic domain, and the haemopexin-like C-terminal domain, which is linked to the catalytic domain by a flexible hinge region.

The pro-peptide
The MMPs are initially synthesized as inactive zymogens with a pro-peptide domain that must be removed before the enzyme is active. The pro-peptide domain is part of the "cysteine switch." This contains a conserved cysteine residue that interacts with the zinc in the active site and prevents binding and cleavage of the substrate, keeping the enzyme in an inactive form. In the majority of the MMPs, the cysteine residue is in the conserved sequence PRCGxPD. Some MMPs have a prohormone convertase cleavage site (Furin-like) as part of this domain, which, when cleaved, activates the enzyme. MMP-23A and MMP-23B include a transmembrane segment in this domain.

The catalytic domain
X-ray crystallographic structures of several MMP catalytic domains have shown that this domain is an oblate sphere measuring 35 x 30 x 30 Å (3.5 × 3 x 3 nm). The active site is a 20 Å  (2 nm) groove that runs across the catalytic domain. In the part of the catalytic domain forming the active site there is a catalytically important Zn2+ ion, which is bound by three histidine residues found in the conserved sequence HExxHxxGxxH. Hence, this sequence is a zinc-binding motif.

The gelatinases, such as MMP-2, incorporate Fibronectin type II modules inserted immediately before in the zinc-binding motif in the catalytic domain.

The hinge region
The catalytic domain is connected to the C-terminal domain by a flexible hinge or linker region. This is up to 75 amino acids long, and has no determinable structure.

The hemopexin-like C-terminal domain

The C-terminal domain has structural similarities to the serum protein hemopexin. It has a four-bladed β-propeller structure. β-Propeller structures provide a large flat surface that is thought to be involved in protein–protein interactions. This determines substrate specificity and is the site for interaction with TIMP's (tissue inhibitor of metalloproteinases). The hemopexin-like domain is absent in MMP-7, MMP-23, MMP-26, and the plant and nematode. The membrane-bound MMPs (MT-MMPs) are anchored to the plasma membrane via a transmembrane or a GPI-anchoring domain.

Catalytic mechanism

There are three catalytic mechanisms published.

 In the first mechanism, Browner M.F. and colleagues proposed the base-catalysis mechanism, carried out by the conserved glutamate residue and the Zn2+ ion.
 In the second mechanism, the Matthews-mechanism, Kester and Matthews suggested an interaction between a water molecule and the Zn2+ ion during the acid-base catalysis.
In the third mechanism, the Manzetti-mechanism, Manzetti Sergio and colleagues provided evidence that a coordination between water and zinc during catalysis was unlikely, and suggested a third mechanism wherein a histidine from the HExxHxxGxxH-motif participates in catalysis by allowing the Zn2+ ion to assume a quasi-penta coordinated state, via its dissociation from it. In this state, the Zn2+ ion is coordinated with the two oxygen atoms from the catalytic glutamic acid, the substrate's carbonyl oxygen atom, and the two histidine residues, and can polarize the glutamic acid's oxygen atom, proximate the scissile bond, and induce it to act as reversible electron donor. This forms an oxyanion transition state. At this stage, a water molecule acts on the dissociated scissile bond and completes the hydrolyzation of the substrate.

Classification

The MMPs can be subdivided in different ways.

Evolutionary

Use of bioinformatic methods to compare the primary sequences of the MMPs suggest the following evolutionary groupings of the MMPs: 
 MMP-19
 MMPs 11, 14, 15, 16, and 17
 MMP-2 and MMP-9
 All the other MMPs

Analysis of the catalytic domains in isolation suggests that the catalytic domains evolved further once the major groups had differentiated, as is also indicated by the substrate specificities of the enzymes.

Functional
The most commonly used groupings (by researchers in MMP biology) are based partly on historical assessment of the substrate specificity of the MMP and partly on the cellular localization of the MMP. These groups are the collagenases, the gelatinases, the stromelysins, and the membrane-type MMPs (MT-MMPs).

 The collagenases are capable of degrading triple-helical fibrillar collagens into distinctive 3/4 and 1/4 fragments. These collagens are the major components of bone, cartilage and dentin, and MMPs are the only known mammalian enzymes capable of degrading them. The collagenases are No. 1, No. 8,  No. 13, and No. 18. In addition, No. 14 has also been shown to cleave fibrillar collagen, and there is evidence that No. 2 is capable of collagenolysis. In MeSH, the current list of collagenases includes No. 1, No. 2, No. 8, No. 9, and No. 13. Collagenase No. 14 is present in MeSH but not listed as a collagenase, while No. 18 is absent from MeSH.
 The main substrates of the gelatinases are type IV collagen and gelatin, and these enzymes are distinguished by the presence of an additional domain inserted into the catalytic domain. This gelatin-binding region is positioned immediately before the zinc-binding motif, and forms a separate folding unit that does not disrupt the structure of the catalytic domain. The gelatinases are No. 2 and No. 9.
 The stromelysins display a broad ability to cleave extracellular matrix proteins but are unable to cleave the triple-helical fibrillar collagens. The three canonical members of this group are No. 3, No. 10, and No. 11.
 All six membrane-type MMPs (No. 14, No. 15, No. 16, No. 17, No. 24, and No. 25) have a furin cleavage site in the pro-peptide, which is a feature also shared by No. 11.

However, it is becoming increasingly clear that these divisions are somewhat artificial as there are a number of MMPs that do not fit into any of the traditional groups.

Genes

Matrix metalloproteinases combines with the metal binding protein, metallothionine; thus helping in metal binding mechanism.

Function
The MMPs play an important role in tissue remodeling associated with various physiological or pathological processes such as morphogenesis, angiogenesis, tissue repair, cirrhosis, arthritis, and metastasis. MMP-2 and MMP-9 are thought to be important in metastasis. MMP-1 is thought to be important in rheumatoid arthritis and osteoarthritis. Recent data suggests active role of MMPs in the pathogenesis of Aortic Aneurysm. Excess MMPs degrade the structural proteins of the aortic wall.  Disregulation of the balance between MMPs and TIMPs is also a characteristic of acute and chronic cardiovascular diseases.

Activation

 All MMPs are synthesized in the latent form (Zymogen). They are secreted as proenzymes and require extracellular activation. They can be activated in vitro by many mechanisms including organomercurials, chaotropic agents, and other proteases.

Inhibitors
The MMPs are inhibited by specific endogenous tissue inhibitor of metalloproteinases (TIMPs), which comprise a family of four protease inhibitors: TIMP-1, TIMP-2, TIMP-3, and TIMP-4.

Synthetic inhibitors generally contain a chelating group that binds the catalytic zinc atom at the MMP active site tightly. Common chelating groups include hydroxamates, carboxylates, thiols, and phosphinyls. Hydroxymates are particularly potent inhibitors of MMPs and other zinc-dependent enzymes, due to their bidentate chelation of the zinc atom. Other substituents of these inhibitors are usually designed to interact with various binding pockets on the MMP of interest, making the inhibitor more or less specific for given MMPs.

Pharmacology
Doxycycline, at subantimicrobial doses, inhibits MMP activity, and has been used in various experimental systems for this purpose, such as for recalcitrant recurrent corneal erosions. It is used clinically for the treatment of periodontal disease and is the only MMP inhibitor that is widely available clinically. It is sold under the trade name Periostat by the company CollaGenex. Minocycline, another tetracycline antibiotic, has also been shown to inhibit MMP activity.

A number of rationally designed MMP inhibitors have shown some promise in the treatment of pathologies that MMPs are suspected to be involved in (see above). However, most of these, such as marimastat (BB-2516), a broad-spectrum MMP inhibitor, and cipemastat (Ro 32-3555), an MMP-1 selective inhibitor, have performed poorly in clinical trials. The failure of Marimastat was partially responsible for the folding of British Biotech, which developed it. The failure of these drugs has been due largely to toxicity (in particular, musculo-skeletal toxicity in the case of broad spectrum inhibitors) and failure to show expected results (in the case of trocade, promising results in rabbit arthritis models were not replicated in human trials). The reasons behind the largely disappointing clinical results of MMP inhibitors is unclear, especially in light of their activity in animal models.

See also
 Proteases in angiogenesis
 Drug discovery and development of MMP inhibitors
Collagen Hybridizing Peptide, a peptide that can bind and stain MMP cleaved collagen

References

Synergistic effect of stromelysin-1 (matrix metalloproteinase-3) promoter (-1171 5A->6A) polymorphism in oral submucous fibrosis and head and neck lesions.Chaudhary AK, Singh M, Bharti AC, Singh M, Shukla S, Singh AK, Mehrotra R.
BMC Cancer. 2010 Jul 14;10:369.

External links
 MBInfo – Matrix metalloproteinases (MMPs) facilitate extracellular matrix disassembly
 The Matrix Metalloproteinase Protein
 Extracellular proteolysis at fibrinolysis.org
 Currently identified substrates for mammalian MMPs at clip.ubc.ca
 

 

Metalloproteins
Zinc enzymes